The Tenth Legislative Assembly of Arunachal Pradesh was constituted after the 2019 Arunachal Pradesh Legislative Assembly elections, which were concluded on 11 April 2019, and the previous assembly term ending on 1 June 2019.

Notable Positions 
The present assembly is the Tenth Legislative Assembly of Arunachal Pradesh.

Members of Legislative Assembly 

Source

See also 

 2019 Arunachal Pradesh Legislative Assembly election
 Arunachal Pradesh Legislative Assembly
 List of constituencies of Arunachal Pradesh Legislative Assembly
 Government of Arunachal Pradesh
 List of governors of Arunachal Pradesh
 List of chief ministers of Arunachal Pradesh

References

External links 

 Arunachal Pradesh Lok Sabha Elections 2019 Results Website
 

 
 
Arunachal Pradesh